Jaahanara is a popular Bengali television soap opera that premiered on 3 September 2018 and aired on Colors Bangla. It was produced by Friends Communication and starred Shweta Mishra and Vicky Dev, Srabani Banik, Ananda Ghosh, and Sumit Samaddar. The show also marks the comeback of Payel De, who was earlier seen on Zee Bangla's Tobu Mone Rekho and Star Jalsha 's Ardhangini. The show was based on a Muslim family and Triple Talaque and was dubbed in Hindi as Jaahanara on Rishtey Europe/Colors Rishtey UK from 10 December 2018 to 11 December 2019.

Series overview
What happens when two sisters find themselves trapped in a deceitful marriage, married to the same man? Set against the backdrop of an orthodox society, this is the story of Jahaanara and Rubina who decide to take on the long-established system of ‘Triple Talaq’. Seeking justice for shackled women everywhere, Jahaanara and Rubina's journey towards freedom is fraught with danger and disasters.

Plot 
The story revolves around Nizamuddin Sheikh, a devout but progressive Muslim. He is against conservative practices of his religion. His two daughters, Rubina and Jahaanara, are of different nature. Jahaanara, a lawyer is fighting for those women who are victims of Triple Talaq. Rubina meanwhile marries Ashraf, the son of the rich and powerful Abdul Khan. Ashraf likes Jahaanara and gives Talaq to Rubina. What happens next?

Cast

Main
Shweta Mishra as Jahaanara Shaikh
Vicky Dev as Ruhaan Khan
Payel De / Suranjana Roy as Rubina Sheikh: Daughter of Nizamuddin, elder sister of Jahanaara , First wife of Ashraf Khan.
Ananda Ghosh as Ashraf Khan: Rubina's husband

Recurring
Shraboni Bonik as Heena
Joy Badlani as  Abdul Khan
Debjani Chattopadhyay / Mallika Banerjee as Rukhsar: Abdul's wife
Kushal Chakraborty as Nizaamuddin Shaikh
Ashish Deb as Kabir
Mayna Banerjee as Masha,: Ashraf's sister
Rupam Singha as Munna

References 

2018 Indian television series debuts
Indian drama television series
Colors Bangla original programming